The Keçiören Gondola is a two-station gondola-type line of aerial lift passenger transport system situated in Keçiören district of Ankara, Turkey. It is operated  by Keçiören Municipality.

The line was designed and the system was delivered by the Turkish ropeway producing company STM Sistem Teleferik from İzmir. The construction works completed in November 2007, and following the test runs, the line went in service in April 2008. It is the longest urban gondola lift line in Turkey.

Sixteen detachable cabins each capable of eight passengers transport hourly 384 people between the two stations. The ride lasts 20 minutes. The municipality dropped the fare from initially 5.00  to 1.00  in April 2013.

Specifications
 Line length: 
 Height distance: 
 Number of stations: 2
 Number of cabins: 16 each eight-seater
 Trip duration: 20 minutes
 Operating speed: max. 
 Hourly ridership: 384
 Cable diameter = 
 Engine power: 160 kW
 Operational hours: 12:00 - 21:00 (Workdays), 12:00 - 22:00 (Weekends)
 Fare: 1.00 
 Terminals:
 Cumhuriyet (Tepebaşı) 
 Atatürk (Kavacık Subayevleri)

See also
 List of gondola lifts in Turkey

References

External links
Images at Keçiören Belediyesi website

Public transport in Ankara
Gondola lifts in Turkey
Keçiören
2008 establishments in Turkey
Transport infrastructure completed in 2008
Tourist attractions in Ankara